Pseudomonas lutea is a Gram-negative, strictly aerobic, non-spore-forming, motile, rod-shaped bacterium originally isolated from the rhizosphere of grasses in Spain. The type strain is LMG 21974.

References

External links
Type strain of Pseudomonas lutea at BacDive -  the Bacterial Diversity Metadatabase

Pseudomonadales
Bacteria described in 2004